Belinda Pritasari Basaruddin Jacobsen is an Indonesian-German actress, TV presenter, model and beauty pageant titleholder who was crowned Miss Earth Indonesia 2015 and Indonesia's representative at Miss Earth 2015 pageant in Vienna, Austria.

Biography
Belinda was born on 6 August 1994 in Jakarta, Indonesia.

Before joining the Miss Earth Indonesia pageant, Belinda was studying under the Faculty of Medicine at University of Indonesia.

Pageantry

Miss Earth Indonesia 2015
Belinda bested other contestants in the Miss Earth Indonesia pageant held at University of Bunda Mulia in Ancol, North Jakarta on 29 August 2015. She was crowned by the outgoing Miss Earth Indonesia 2014, Annisa Ananda Nusyirwan.

Miss Earth 2015
Winning the Miss Earth Indonesia 2015 title, Belinda is Indonesia's representative at Miss Earth 2015 she was unplaced.

References

Living people
Miss Earth 2015 contestants
1994 births
Indonesian beauty pageant winners
People from Jakarta